The Flinn or O'Flinn were rulers within Gaelic Irelands medieval over-kingdom of Ulaid. The O'Flinn were the chiefs of the Ui Tuirtre, a people seated on the east side of the River Bann and Lough Neagh in what today is Northern Ireland's County Antrim. The Flinn claim descent from Fiachra Tort, the grandson of the Irish king Colla Uais, who seized territory of the Ulaid in the 4th century A.D.

Notable people
Alex Flinn (born 1966), American writer
Anthony Flinn (born 1980), British chef
Denny Martin Flinn (1947-2007), American writer and choreographer
Hugo Flinn (1879–1943), Irish politician
John Flinn (born 1954), former Major League baseball pitcher
John Flinn (politician) (died c. 1900), Canadian politician in Nova Scotia
Kathleen Flinn (born 1967), American writer and journalist
Kelly Flinn (born 1970), former United States Air Force pilot
Kelton Flinn, American computer game designer
Michael Flinn (1917–1983), British economic historian
Ryan Flinn (American football) (born 1980), former American football punter
Ryan Flinn (ice hockey) (born 1980), Canadian ice hockey winger

See also 
 Flynn
 Flinn (disambiguation)

References

Surnames of Irish origin
Irish royal families